Ryan J. Brown (born 29 August 1991) is an English screenwriter, born in Scunthorpe, Lincolnshire, United Kingdom. Brown is the writer and creator of BBC comedy-horror series Wreck.

In 2023 Brown was named one of the Top 10 most influential LGBTQ+ trailblazers in Film, TV + Music by Attitude Magazine.

Education and career
Brown studied at Goldsmiths and Mountview Academy of Theatre Arts.

In 2016, he won the BAFTA New Writing Prize for TV Drama for his LGBT crime drama We Are Your Children, which was selected for The Brit List TV 2018, an annual selection of the best unproduced screenplays as voted for by the industry. In 2019, Brown was again featured highly on The Brit List for the second time with his Big Talk Productions project Only Child.

In March 2021, the BBC announced they were to make Brown's six-part comedy-horror series Wreck, from Fremantle Media’s Euston Films. The series is set aboard a cruise ship and follows 19-year-old new recruit Jamie as he joins the crew in search of his missing sister. The series was broadcast on BBC Three and BBC iPlayer in 2022. The show was received favourably with Attitude, Gay Times and The Queer Review featuring the series on their lists of Top LGBT TV Shows of 2022.

Wreck was renewed for a second series in October 2022, set for a 2023 broadcast.

Filmography

Television

References

External links
 Official Website
 

1991 births
Living people
People from Scunthorpe
British television writers
English male stage actors
English male television actors
English television writers
English screenwriters
English male screenwriters
21st-century English male actors
LGBT male actors
English LGBT actors